Leptobarbus hosii, the Sayan Barb also locally called as Piam and Temopong is a species of ray-finned fish in the genus Leptobarbus from freshwater habitats in northern Borneo in southeast Asia. However, a previously unknown population has been recorded in West Kalimantan.

Named in honor of Charles Hose (1863–1929), British colonial administrator in Borneo, zoologist and ethnologist, who collected the type specimen.

Description 
Little is known of the species except for its appearance. The fins are red to maroon, while near the gill plate and above the pelvic fin there is a black vertical spot. It does not have a black lateral line running along its body, unlike L. melanotaenia and L. rubripinna.

Maxing out at 8.5 cm, it is possibly the smallest member of its genus.

References 

hosii
Taxa named by Charles Tate Regan
Fish described in 1906